Brazil competed at the 1936 Summer Olympics in Berlin, Germany. 73 competitors, 67 men and 6 women, took part in 37 events in 9 sports.

Athletics

Sílvio Magalhães Padilha (flagbearer, and future COB president).
Men
Track & road events

Field events

Basketball

Men's tournament

First round

Second round

Second consolation round

Third round

Cycling

Three cyclists, all male, represented Brazil in 1936.

Road

Fencing

Six fencers, five men and one woman, represented Brazil in 1936.
 Men
Ranks given are within the pool.

 Women
Ranks given are within the pool.

Modern pentathlon

Three male pentathletes represented Brazil in 1936.
Men

Rowing

Brazil had 22 male rowers participate in six out of seven rowing events in 1936.

Sailing

Open

Shooting

Four shooters represented Brazil in 1936.
Men

Swimming

Men

Women

References

External links
Official Olympic Reports
Brazilian Olympic Committee
 Duarte, Marcelo. O Guia dos Curiosos: Jogos Olímpicos. 

Nations at the 1936 Summer Olympics
1936
1936 in Brazilian sport